Devonport High School is a government co-educational comprehensive junior secondary school located in , Tasmania, Australia. The school caters for approximately 500 students from Years 7 to 12. The school is administered by the Tasmanian Department of Education.

In 2019 student enrolments were 476. The school principal is Peter Bird. 

In March 2017, it was announced that the school was one of eighteen high schools expanded from Years 7 to 10, to cover Years 11 and 12.

See also 
 List of schools in Tasmania
 Education in Tasmania

References

External links
 

Public high schools in Tasmania
Devonport, Tasmania